Canadian Gaelic or Cape Breton Gaelic (or ), often known in Canadian English simply as Gaelic, is a collective term for the dialects of Scottish Gaelic spoken in Atlantic Canada.

Scottish Gaels were settled in Nova Scotia from 1773, with the arrival of the ship Hector. and continuing until the 1850s. Gaelic has been spoken since then in Nova Scotia on Cape Breton Island and on the northeastern mainland of the province. Scottish Gaelic is a member of the Goidelic branch of the Celtic languages and the Canadian dialectics have their origins in the Highlands and Islands of Scotland. The parent language developed out of Middle Irish and is closely related to modern Irish. The Canadian branch is a close cousin of the Irish language in Newfoundland. At its peak in the mid-19th century, there were as many as 200,000 speakers of Scottish Gaelic and Newfoundland Irish together, making it the third-most-spoken European language in Canada after English and French.

In Atlantic Canada today, there are approximately 2,000 speakers, mainly in Nova Scotia. In terms of the total number of speakers in the 2011 census, there were 7,195 total speakers of "Gaelic languages" in Canada, with 1,365 in Nova Scotia and Prince Edward Island where the responses mainly refer to Scottish Gaelic. The 2016 census also reported that 240 residents of Nova Scotia and 15 on Prince Edward Island considered Scottish Gaelic to be their "mother tongue".

While there have been many different regional dialects of Scottish Gaelic that have been spoken in other communities across Canada, particularly in Glengarry County, Ontario, Atlantic Canada is the only area in North America where Gaelic continues to be spoken as a community language, especially in Cape Breton. Even there the use of the language is precarious and its survival is being fought for. Even so, the Gaelic-speaking communities in Canada have contributed many great figures to the history of Scottish Gaelic literature, including Ailean a' Ridse MacDhòmhnaill and John MacLean during the days of early settlement and Lewis MacKinnon, whose Canadian Gaelic poetry won the Bardic Crown at the 2011 Royal National Mòd at Stornoway.

Distribution

The Gaelic cultural identity community is a part of Nova Scotia's diverse peoples and communities. Thousands of Nova Scotians attend Gaelic-related activities and events annually including: language workshops and immersions, milling frolics, square dances, fiddle and piping sessions, concerts and festivals. Up until about the turn of the 20th century, Gaelic was widely spoken on eastern Prince Edward Island (PEI). In the 2011 Canadian Census, 10 individuals in PEI cited that their mother tongue was a Gaelic language, with over 90 claiming to speak a Gaelic language.

Gaels, and their language and culture, have influenced the heritage of Glengarry County and other regions in present-day Ontario, where many Highland Scots settled commencing in the 18th century, and to a much lesser extent the provinces of New Brunswick, Newfoundland and Labrador (especially the Codroy Valley), Manitoba and Alberta. Gaelic-speaking poets in communities across Canada have produced a large and significant branch of Scottish Gaelic literature comparable to that of Scotland itself.

History

Arrival of earliest Gaels
In 1621, King James VI of Scotland allowed privateer William Alexander to establish the first Scottish colony overseas. The group of Highlanders – all of whom were Gaelic-speaking – were settled at what is presently known as Port Royal, on the western shore of Nova Scotia.

Within a year the colony had failed. Subsequent attempts to relaunch it were cancelled when in 1631 the Treaty of Saint-Germain-en-Laye returned Nova Scotia to French rule.

Almost a half-century later, in 1670, the Hudson's Bay Company was given exclusive trading rights to all North American lands draining into Hudson Bay – about 3.9 million km2 (1.5 million sq mi – an area larger than India). Many of the traders who came in the later 18th and 19th centuries were Gaelic speakers from the Scottish Highlands who brought their language to the interior.

Those who intermarried with the local First Nations people passed on their language, with the effect that by the mid-18th century there existed a sizeable population of Métis traders with Scottish and aboriginal ancestry, and command of spoken Gaelic.

Gaels in 18th- and 19th-century settlements
As a result of the conflict Highland regiments who fought for the British secured a reputation for tenacity and combat prowess. In turn the countryside itself secured a reputation among the Highlanders for its size, beauty, and wealth of natural resources.

They would remember Canada when the earliest of the Highland Clearances by the increasingly Anglicized Scottish nobility began to evict Gaelic-speaking tenants en masse from their ancestral lands in order to replace them with private deer-stalking estates and herds of sheep. 

The first ship loaded with Hebridean colonists arrived at Île-St.-Jean (Prince Edward Island) in 1770, with later ships following in 1772, and 1774. In September 1773 a ship named The Hector landed in Pictou, Nova Scotia, with 189 settlers who departed from Loch Broom. In 1784 the last barrier to Scottish settlement – a law restricting land-ownership on Cape Breton Island – was repealed, and soon both PEI and Nova Scotia were predominantly Gaelic-speaking. Between 1815 and 1870, it is estimated that more than 50,000 Gaelic settlers immigrated to Nova Scotia alone. Many of them left behind poetry and other works of Scottish Gaelic literature.

The poet Mìcheal Mór MacDhòmhnaill emigrated from South Uist to Cape Breton around 1775 and a poem describing his first winter there survives. Anna NicGillìosa emigrated from Morar to Glengarry County, Ontario in 1786 and a Gaelic poem in praise of her new home also survives. Lord Selkirk's settler Calum Bàn MacMhannain, alias Malcolm Buchanan, left behind the song-poem Òran an Imrich ("The Song of Emigration"), which describes his 1803 voyage from the Isle of Skye to Belfast, Prince Edward Island and his impressions of his new home as Eilean an Àigh ("The Island of Prosperity"). Ailean a' Ridse MacDhòmhnaill (Allan The Ridge MacDonald) emigrated with his family from Ach nan Comhaichean, Glen Spean, Lochaber to Mabou, Nova Scotia in 1816 and composed many works of Gaelic poetry as a homesteader in Cape Breton and in Antigonish County. The most prolific emigre poet was John MacLean of Caolas, Tiree, the former Chief Bard to the 15th Chief of Clan MacLean of Coll, who emigrated with his family to Nova Scotia in 1819.

The poem has since been collected and recorded from seanchaithe in both Scotland and the New World.

According to Michael Newton, however, which is, "an expression of disappointment and regret", ended upon becoming, "so well established in the emigrant repertoire that it easily eclipses his later songs taking delight in the Gaelic communities in Nova Scotia and their prosperity."

In the Highlands and Islands, MacLean is commonly known as "The Poet to the Laird of Coll" or as "John, son of Allan". In Nova Scotia, he is known colloquially today as, "The Bard MacLean" or as "The Barney's River Poet", after MacLean's original family homestead in Pictou County, Nova Scotia.

With the end of the American War of Independence, immigrants newly arrived from Scotland were joined in Canada by so-called "United Empire Loyalist" refugees fleeing persecution and the seizure of their land claims by American Patriots. These settlers arrived on a mass scale at the arable lands of British North America, with large numbers settling in Glengarry County in present-day Ontario, and in the Eastern Townships of Quebec.

Unlike in the Gaelic-speaking settlements along the Cape Fear River in North Carolina, there was no Gaelic printing press in Canada. For this reason, in 1819, Rev. Seumas MacGriogar, the first Gaelic-speaking Presbyterian minister appointed to Nova Scotia, had to publish his collection of Christian poetry in Glasgow.

Printing presses soon followed, though, and the first Gaelic-language books printed in Canada, all of which were Presbyterian religious books, were published at Pictou, Nova Scotia and Charlottetown, Prince Edward Island in 1832. The first Gaelic language books published in Toronto and Montreal, which were also Presbyterian religious books, appeared between 1835 and 1836. The first Catholic religious books published in the Gaelic-language were printed at Pictou in 1836.

Red River colony
In 1812, Thomas Douglas, 5th Earl of Selkirk obtained  to build a colony at the forks of the Red River, in what would become Manitoba. With the help of his employee and friend, Archibald McDonald, Selkirk sent over 70 Scottish settlers, many of whom spoke only Gaelic, and had them establish a small farming colony there. The settlement soon attracted local First Nations groups, resulting in an unprecedented interaction of Scottish (Lowland, Highland, and Orcadian), English, Cree, French, Ojibwe, Saulteaux, and Métis traditions all in close contact.

In the 1840s, Toronto Anglican priest John Black was sent to preach to the settlement, but "his lack of the Gaelic was at first a grievous disappointment" to parishioners. With continuing immigration the population of Scots colonists grew to more than 300, but by the 1860s the French–Métis outnumbered the Scots, and tensions between the two groups would prove a major factor in the ensuing Red River Rebellion.

The continuing association between the Selkirk colonists and surrounding First Nations groups evolved into a unique contact language. Used primarily by the Anglo– and Scots–Métis traders, the "Red River Dialect" or Bungi was a mixture of Gaelic and English with many terms borrowed from the local native languages. Whether the dialect was a trade pidgin or a fully developed mixed language is unknown. Today the Scots–Métis have largely been absorbed by the more dominant French–Métis culture, and the Bungi dialect is most likely extinct.

Status in the 19th- and early 20th-century
James Gillanders of Highfield Cottage near Dingwall, was the Factor for the estate of Major Charles Robertson of Kincardine and, as his employer was then serving with the British Army in Australia, Gillanders was the person most responsible for the mass evictions staged at Glencalvie, Ross-shire in 1845. A Gaelic-language poem denouncing Gillanders for the brutality of the evictions was later submitted anonymously to Pàdraig MacNeacail, the editor of the column in Canadian Gaelic in which the poem was later published in the Nova Scotia newspaper The Casket. The poem, which is believed to draw upon eyewitness accounts, is believed to be the only Gaelic-language source relating to the evictions in Glencalvie.

By 1850, Gaelic was the third most-common mother tongue in British North America after English and French (when excluding Indigenous languages), and is believed to have been spoken by more than 200,000 British North Americans at that time. A large population who spoke the related Irish immigrated to Scots Gaelic communities and to Irish settlements in Newfoundland.

In Prince Edward Island, Cape Breton and Glengarry there were large areas of Gaelic unilingualism, and communities of Gaelic-speakers had established themselves in northeastern Nova Scotia (around Pictou and Antigonish); in Glengarry, Stormont, Grey, and Bruce Counties in Ontario; in the Codroy Valley of Newfoundland; in Winnipeg, Manitoba; and Eastern Quebec.

In 1890, Thomas Robert McInnes, an independent Senator from British Columbia (born Lake Ainslie, Cape Breton Island) tabled a bill entitled "An Act to Provide for the Use of Gaelic in Official Proceedings." He cited the ten Scottish and eight Irish senators who spoke Gaelic, and 32 members of the House of Commons of Canada who spoke either Scottish Gaelic or Irish. The bill was defeated 42–7.

Despite the widespread disregard by government on Gaelic issues, records exist of at least one criminal trial conducted entirely in Gaelic, .

From the mid-19th century to the early 1930s, several Gaelic-language newspapers were published in Canada, although the greatest concentration of such papers was in Cape Breton. From 1840 to 1841,  was published in Kingston, Ontario, and in 1851,  launched the monthly  in Antigonish, Nova Scotia, which lasted a year before being replaced by the English-language Antigonish Casket, which initially occasional Gaelic-language material. On Cape Breton, several Gaelic-language newspapers were published in Sydney.

In 1917, Rev. Murdoch Lamont (1865-1927), a Gaelic-speaking Presbyterian minister from Orwell, Queen's County, Prince Edward Island, published a small, vanity press booklet titled, An Cuimhneachain: Òrain Céilidh Gàidheal Cheap Breatuinn agus Eilean-an-Phrionnsa ("The Remembrance: Céilidh Songs of the Cape Breton and Prince Edward Island Gaels") in Quincy, Massachusetts. Due to Rev. Lamont's pamphlet, the most complete versions survive of the oral poetry composed in Gaelic upon Prince Edward Island.

Reasons for decline
Despite the long history of Gaels and their language and culture in Canada, the Gaelic speech population started to decline after 1850. This drop was a result of prejudice (both from outside, and from within the Gaelic community itself), aggressive dissuasion in school and government, and the perceived prestige of English.

Gaelic has faced widespread prejudice in Great Britain for generations, and those feelings were easily transposed to British North America.

The fact that Gaelic had not received official status in its homeland made it easier for Canadian legislators to disregard the concerns of domestic speakers. Legislators questioned why "privileges should be asked for Highland Scotchmen in [the Canadian Parliament] that are not asked for in their own country". Politicians who themselves spoke the language held opinions that would today be considered misinformed; Lunenburg Senator Henry Kaulback, in response to Thomas Robert McInnes's Gaelic bill, described the language as only "well suited to poetry and fairy tales". The belief that certain languages had inherent strengths and weaknesses was typical in the 19th century, but has been rejected by modern linguistics.

Around 1880,  from The North Shore, wrote "" (also known in English as "The Yankee Girl"), a humorous song recounting the growing phenomenon of Gaels shunning their mother-tongue.

With the outbreak of World War II, the Canadian government attempted to prevent the use of Gaelic on public telecommunications systems. The government believed Gaelic was used by subversives affiliated with Ireland, a neutral country perceived to be tolerant of the Nazis. In Prince Edward Island and Cape Breton where the Gaelic language was strongest, it was actively discouraged in schools with corporal punishment.

Job opportunities for unilingual Gaels were few and restricted to the dwindling Gaelic-communities, compelling most into the mines or the fishery. Many saw English fluency as the key to success, and for the first time in Canadian history Gaelic-speaking parents were teaching their children to speak English en masse. The sudden stop of Gaelic language acquisition, caused by shame and prejudice, was the immediate cause of the drastic decline in Gaelic fluency in the 20th century.

According to Antigonish County Gaelic poet and politician Lewis MacKinnon, "We are just like the native peoples here, our culture is indigenous to this region. We too have suffered injustices, we too have been excluded, we too have been forgotten and ridiculed for something that is simply part of who and what we are. It's part of our human expression and that story needs to be told."

Ultimately the population dropped from a peak of 200,000 in 1850, to 80,000 in 1900, to 30,000 in 1930 and 500–1,000 today. There are no longer entire communities of Canadian Gaelic-speakers, although traces of the language and pockets of speakers are relatively commonplace on Cape Breton, and especially in traditional strongholds like Christmas Island, The North Shore, and Baddeck.

Contemporary language, culture, and arts initiatives

A. W. R. MacKenzie founded the Nova Scotia Gaelic College at St Ann's in 1939. St Francis Xavier University in Antigonish has a Celtic Studies department with Gaelic-speaking faculty members, and is the only such university department outside Scotland to offer four full years of Scottish Gaelic instruction.

 of Antigonish published the monthly Gaelic magazine  around 1851.

Eòin and Seòras MacShuail, believed to be the only black speakers of Goidelic languages in Canada, were born in Cape Breton and in adulthood became friends with Rudyard Kipling, who in 1896 wrote Captains Courageous, which featured an isolated Gaelic-speaking African-Canadian cook from Cape Breton.

Many English-speaking writers and artists of Scottish-Canadian ancestry have featured Canadian Gaelic in their works, among them Alistair MacLeod (No Great Mischief), Ann-Marie MacDonald (Fall on Your Knees), and D.R. MacDonald (Cape Breton Road). Gaelic singer Mary Jane Lamond has released several albums in the language, including the 1997 hit  ('Jenny Dang the Weaver'). Cape Breton fiddling is a unique tradition of Gaelic and Acadian styles, known in fiddling circles worldwide.

Several Canadian schools use the "Gael" as a mascot, the most prominent being Queen's University in Kingston, Ontario. The university's team is nicknamed the Golden Gaels.

The Gaelic character of Nova Scotia has influenced that province's industry and traditions. Glen Breton Rare, produced in Cape Breton, is one of the very few single malt whiskies to be made outside Scotland.

Gaelic settlers in Nova Scotia adapted the popular Highland winter sport of Highland winter sport of shinty, which was traditionally played by the Gaels upon St. Andrew's Day, Christmas Day, New Year's Day, Handsel Monday, and Candlemas, to the much colder Canadian winter climate by playing on frozen lakes while wearing ice skates. This led to the creation of the modern sport known as ice hockey.

It's part of who they are, you can't just throw that away. It's in you."

While performing in 2000 at the annual Cèilidh at Christmas Island, Cape Breton, Barra native and legendary Gaelic singer Flora MacNeil spread her arms wide and cried, "You are my people!" The hundreds of Canadian-born Gaels in the audience immediately erupted into loud cheers.

According to Natasha Sumner, the current literary and cultural revival of the Gaelic language in Nova Scotia was largely instigated by Kenneth E. Nilsen (1941-2012), an American linguist with a specialty in Celtic languages. During his employment as Professor of Gaelic Studies at St. Francis Xavier University in Antigonish, Nilsen was known for his contagious enthusiasm for both teaching and recording the distinctive Nova Scotia dialect of the Gaelic-language, its folklore, and its oral literature. Several important leaders in the recent Canadian Gaelic revival, including the poet Lewis MacKinnon, have credited Nilsen with sparking their interest in learning the Gaelic language and in actively fighting for its survival.

During his time as Professor of Gaelic Studies, Nilsen would take his students every year to visit the grave of the Tiree-born Bard Iain mac Ailein (John MacLean) (1787–1848) at Glenbard, Antigonish County, Nova Scotia. Following Prof. Nilsen's death in 2012, MacKinnon composed a Gaelic-language poetic lament for his former teacher, entitled .

There's only an ocean separating us. We're like another island off the coast of Scotland but we have an ocean separating us instead of a strait or a channel."

The first Gaelic language film to be made in North America, The Wake of Calum MacLeod is a six-minute short filmed in Cape Breton.

In a major innovation, the 2011 Royal National Mòd, held at Stornoway on the Isle of Lewis, crowned Lewis MacKinnon, a poet in Canadian Gaelic from Antigonish County, Nova Scotia, as the winning Bard. It was the first time in the 120-year history of the Mòd that a writer of Gaelic poetry from the Scottish diaspora had won the Bardic Crown.

The Gaelic scholar Michael Newton made a half-hour documentary, Singing Against the Silence (2012), about the revival of Nova Scotia Gaelic in that language; he has also published an anthology of Canadian Gaelic literature,  (2015).

Lewis MacKinnon's 2017 Gaelic poetry collection  ("Seasons for Seeking"), includes both his original poetry and his literary translations of the Persian poetry of Sufi mystic Rumi, all of which are themed around the seasons of the year.

Outlook and development

Efforts to address the decline specifically of Gaelic language in Nova Scotia began in the late 1980s.  Two conferences on the status of Gaelic language and culture held on Cape Breton Island set the stage.  Starting in the late 1990s, the Nova Scotia government began studying ways it might enhance Gaelic in the province.

In December 2006 the Office of Gaelic Affairs was established.

In Prince Edward Island, the Colonel Gray High School now offers both an introductory and an advanced course in Gaelic; both language and history are taught in these classes. This is the first recorded time that Gaelic has ever been taught as an official course on Prince Edward Island.

Maxville Public School in Maxville, Glengarry, Ontario, Canada offers Scottish Gaelic lessons weekly.  The last "fluent" Gaelic-speaker in Ontario, descended from the original settlers of Glengarry County, died in 2001.

The city of Vancouver's Scottish Cultural Centre also holds seasonal Scottish Gaelic evening classes.

Government
A Gaelic economic impact study completed by the Nova Scotia government in 2002 estimates that Gaelic generates over $23.5 million annually, with nearly 380,000 people attending approximately 2,070 Gaelic events annually. This study inspired a subsequent report, the Gaelic Preservation Strategy, which polled the community's desire to preserve Gaelic while seeking consensus on adequate reparative measures.

These two documents are watersheds in the timeline of Canadian Gaelic, representing the first concrete steps taken by a provincial government to recognize the language's decline and engage local speakers in reversing this trend. The documents recommend community development, strengthening education, legislating road signs and publications, and building ties between the Gaelic community and other Nova Scotia "heritage language" communities Mi'kmaq, Acadian French and African Nova Scotian.

Increased ties were called for between Nova Scotia and Scotland, and the first such agreement, the Memorandum of Understanding, was signed in 2002.

Education
Today over a dozen public institutions offer Gaelic courses, (such as a Canadian History course in Gaelic at North Nova Education Centre, Nova Scotia) in addition to advanced programmes conducted at Cape Breton, St Francis Xavier, and Saint Mary's Universities.

The Nova Scotia Highland Village offers a bilingual interpretation site, presenting Gaelic and English interpretation for visitors and offering programmes for the local community members and the general public.

The Gaelic College in St. Anns offers Gaelic immersion weekends, weeks and summer programs.

Sponsored by local Gaelic organizations and societies, ongoing Gaelic language adult immersion classes involving hundreds of individuals are held in over a dozen communities in the province. These immersion programs focus on learning language through activity, props and repetition. Reading, writing and grammar are introduced after the student has had a minimum amount of exposure to hearing and speaking Gaelic through everyday contextualized activities.

Linguistic features

The phonology of some Canadian Gaelic dialects have diverged in several ways from the standard Gaelic spoken in Scotland, while others have remained the same. According to Antigonish County poet Lewis MacKinnon, "The dialect of Gaelic that I speak... doesn't exist anymore in Scotland."

Gaelic terms unique to Canada exist, though research on the exact number is deficient. The language has also had a considerable effect on Cape Breton English.

Phonology
 → 
 → 
 → 

Vocabulary  noun  a velvet offering pouch for church.  noun  a term which refers to a heavy ankle sock sold with a rubberized sole that was worn in Cape Breton for decades ago. The term also refers to a pull-on leg warmer for use when wearing the kilt in cold climates. noun  a wooded clearing burnt for planting crops, literally "forest park". noun a will-o'-the-wisp. verb a Gaelicisation of the English verb "to skate". (pl. ) noun a Gaelicisation of the English noun "cent". The term  is used in Canada and the U.S. instead of the word , which refers to a British pound. "Sgillinn" is used both in Canada and Scotland to refer to coins. noun a Gaelicisation of the English word smuggler. verb a Gaelicisation of the English verb "to pound". (literally "three pence"). phrasal noun a dime. (literally "six pence"). phrasal noun twenty cents. (literally "a shilling"). phrasal noun fifty cents. (literally "two shillings and six pence"). phrasal noun a dollar. (literally "five shillings"). noun a Gaelicisation of the English noun "store". Although the word stòr does refer to a storage building as well as wealth, the Gaelic term "bùth" is sometimes used amongst Gaelic speakers in Nova Scotia today. noun workhouse (penitentiary). noun a feast. noun The Canadian Prairies. noun common loon. noun collective noun, e.g. "poidhle airgid" ("a lot of money"), or "poidhle de dhaoine" ("a lot of people") A Gaelicisation of the English word "pile", possibly influenced by the Gaelic expression "tòrr" of similar usage and meaning. or  noun "trip" or "turn". Same usage and meaning as Gaelic . Also used in certain Gaelic dialects in Scotland. . verbal noun wondering.

Gaelic in Nova Scotia English  noun  a boor, oaf, bungler.  noun  garbage. Also used in Gaelic in Scotland.skiff  noun  a deep blanket of snow covering the ground.

List of Scottish Gaelic place names in Canada

Names in Cape Breton Island
Glendale: 
Inverness:  or 
Chimney Corner: 
Long Point: 
Judique: 
Mabou:  or 
Southwest Margaree: 
Whycocomagh: 
Ainslie Glen: 
Craigmore: 
Baddeck: 
Iona: 
The North Shore: 
St Ann's: 
Englishtown: 
Christmas Island: 
Big Beach: 
Grand Mira: 
Big Pond: 
Loch Lomond: 
Marion Bridge: 
Sydney: 
Grand River: 
Port Hastings: 
Port Hawkesbury:  or 
Neil's Harbour: 

Names in mainland Nova Scotia
Antigonish 
Arisaig 
Broad Cove: 
Giant's Lake 
Halifax , or  
Pictou 
Stellarton 
Westville 
Trenton 

Elsewhere in CanadaGlengarry County, Ont. 
Bruce County, Ont. 
Nova Scotia  or 
Sable Island (part of Nova Scotia) 
Newfoundland  or 
Lewes, Prince Edward Island 
New Brunswick 
Quebec 
Calgary, Alberta 
Vancouver 
Stornoway, Quebec 

See also
 Scottish Gaelic
 Bungi Creole
 List of Scottish place names in Canada

Notes and references

Notes

References

Seanchaidh na Coille/Memory-Keeper of the Forest. Anthology of Scottish-Gaelic Literature of Canada in original Gaelic with English translation, with historical and literary commentary.  
Iomairtean na Gàidhlig. Gaelic Affairs Division, Government of Nova Scotia.  
Cainnt mo Mhàthar. Digital audio/visual archives of Canadian Gaels speaking Gaelic.  
Virtual Museum Exhibit on Cape Breton Gaelic Culture
Work through Time Audio and text archive of Cape Breton histories.  
Gaelic Economic-impact Study. Nova Scotia government report on Gaelic.  
Gaelic Preservation Strategy. Nova Scotia government strategy proposal.  
The Encyclopædia of Canada's Cultures: The Case of Gaelic
Scottish Gaelic College of Celtic Arts and Crafts
Gaelic Placenames in Nova Scotia
Gaelic Map of Nova Scotia 
Gaelic Placenames of Scotland and Canada
Nova Scotia Gaelic Visual Archives
Highland Village Museum/An Clachan Gàidhealach, Iona, Nova Scotia
Gaelic in Prince Edward Island
Leugh Seo Gaelic Collection of the Cape Breton Library  
Cape Breton Cèilidh 
St Francis Xavier University Gaelic Resources  Se Ceap Breatainn Tìr Mo Ghràidh. Part One and Part Two. Scottish documentary on Canadian Gaelic-speaking community . 
Aiseirigh nan Gàidheal. Canadian Gaelic radio show.  
Mac-Talla. Canadian Gaelic newspaper, 540 issues. 
Fiosrachadh 'o'n Luchd-riaghlaidh mo Dheighinn Chanada. 1892. Book describing life in Canada, by Ùghdarras Pàrlamaid Chanada.
Machraichean Mòra Chanada. 1907. Book describing immigration to the Canadian Prairies.
White people, Indians, and Highlanders: tribal peoples and colonial encounters in Scotland and North America. Calloway, Colin Gordon.
Speaking Canadian English: an informal account of the English language in Canada. Orkin, Mark M.
Canadian History: Beginnings to Confederation. Taylor, Martin Brook & Owram, Doug.
Language in Canada. Edwards, John R.
Bilingualism and language death
Transactions of the Gaelic Society of Inverness. Vol.s III & IV. 1873-4, 1874–5.
Na h-Albannaich agus Canada  
19th century Ontario Gaelic song.

Further reading
 Margaret Bennett, The Last Stronghold: Scottish Gaelic Traditions in Newfoundland (Canada's Atlantic Folklore-folklife series). Canongate Books Ltd, Breakwater Books Ltd, 1989 /  - ,  - 
 Margaret Bennett, Oatmeal and the Catechism: Scottish Gaelic Settlers  in Quebec (Mcgill-Queen's Studies in Ethnic History). McGill Queens University Press, Birlinn, 1999, 2002, 2004.  – ,,  - ,  – , 
 John Lorne Campbell (1990) Songs Remembered in Exile: Traditional Gaelic Songs from Nova Scotia Recorded in Cape Breton and Antigonish County in 1937, with an Account of the Causes of the Highland Emigration, 1790–1835. Tunes mostly transcribed by Séamus Ennis; illustrations by Margaret Fay Shaw. Published by Aberdeen University Press 1990, Reprinted in 1999 by Birlinn.
 Edited by Jo MacDonald (2015), Cuimhneachan: Bàrdachd a' Chiad Chogaidh/Remembrance: Gaelic Poetry of World War One, Acair Books, Stornoway, Isle of Lewis. Forward by HRH Prince Charles, Duke of Rothesay
 
 Effie Rankin (2004), As a’ Bhràighe / Beyond the Braes: The Gaelic Songs of Allan the Ridge MacDonald (1794-1868), Cape Breton University Press, Sydney, Nova Scotia.

External links
 Comhairle na Gàidhlig – The Gaelic Council of Nova Scotia 
 Nova Scotia Office of Gaelic Affairs
 Comunn Gàidhlig Bhancoubhair – The Gaelic Society of Vancouver (Canada)
 Cainnt mo Mhàthar (My Mother's Language) Extended recordings of native speakers 
 Litir do Luchd-Ionnsachaidh 
 2013 Canadian Gaelic Calendar 
 
 The Gaels and their Place-Names in Nova Scotia - Interactive map of Nova Scotia showing Gaelic place names around the province

 
Languages of Canada
Endangered diaspora languages
Endangered Celtic languages
Diaspora languages
Language conflict in Canada